Devin Bush may refer to:

Devin Bush Sr. (born 1973), American football safety
Devin Bush Jr. (born 1998), American football linebacker